Draba exunguiculata is a species of flowering plant in the family Brassicaceae known by the common names clawless draba and Grays Peak draba. It is endemic to Colorado in the United States.

This plant is a perennial herb forming a tight clump on the ground. It has a branching caudex and stems just a few centimeters long. It has linear or lance-shaped leaves up to 2.5 centimeters long. The undersides and sometimes the top sides of the leaf blades have tiny hairs. The inflorescence is a raceme of several flowers with yellow petals each up to 3 millimeters long. The plant can be distinguished from Draba grayana, which grows in the same area, by its non-clawed petals and the arrangement of hairs on its stems.

This plant is a Rocky Mountains endemic occurring mostly around Grays Peak and Torreys Peak. It grows in subalpine habitat and alpine tundra at elevations between 11,700 and 14,000 feet. It grows on fellfields and other rocky soils. It sometimes grows under overhanging rock and between boulders that help protect it from the harsh climate. It is usually distributed in small patches of individuals. Other plants in the habitat include similar cushion plants. Species associated with the draba include Deschampsia caespitosa, Acomastylis rossii, Carex rupestris, Lidia obtusiloba, Trifolium nanum, and Lidia biflora.

The main threat to the species is recreational activity, such as hiking and skiing, in the habitat.

References

External links
USDA Plants Profile

exunguiculata
Flora of Colorado
Plants described in 1927